Karabük is a town and the capital district of Karabük Province in the Black Sea region of Turkey. According to the 2009 census, population of the city is 108 167.

Karabük was built in the 1930s as the seat of the iron and steel industry of Turkey, and thus is prone to the hazardous effects of air pollution. Karabük lies in a location near Filyos River formed by the merge of Araç and Soğanlı rivers.

Name
There are no known records of the origin of its name; in Turkish kara means "black" or "land" and bük means "bush" or "blackberry bush" ("bramble"). So Karabük means "blackbush".

History
Karabük is situated on an important trade route between Amasra on the coast and central Anatolia. The history of the city goes back to the early years of the Turkish Republic, when it was a small sub-village formed by 13 houses in the Öğlebeli village of Safranbolu. There was also a small train station on the Ankara–Zonguldak route. The town started to develop with the industrialization of the country. One of the first steel factories of the Republic was built here in 1939, after which it grew rapidly and incorporated Öğlebeli village as a quarter. Karabük became a municipality and then a township in the Safranbolu district in 1941. It became a district center in 1953 and a provincial center in 1995.

Hadrianapolis (now Eskipazar), is an ancient city from the Roman Empire of the 4th century, located about 3 km from Karabük. There are many fountains, churches, and Roman baths. Although most of it is recently excavated, illegal excavations which have been going on for many years and have damaged Eskipazar's chances of becoming a major tourist attraction.

Climate
Karabük has a humid subtropical climate (Köppen: Cfa) or a relatively warm oceanic climate (Trewartha: Do) with hot, humid summers and chilly, wet winters.

Economy
Karabük has its own resources of dolomite and limestone, while coal and manganese is brought from Zonguldak and iron ore from Divriği. This allows a varied, yet basic industry in Karabük, including a coking plant, blast furnaces, a foundry and tube works. There are also chemical plants that produce sulfuric acid and phosphates. Nearby are the Zonguldak coal fields.

One of the major steel producers in Turkey, namely Kardemir (Karabük Iron and Steel Works), is located in Karabük.

Gallery

Notes

References

External links

District governor's official web site 
Karabük Haber Sitesi 
Karabük Internet Magazine 
Kardemir official web site 
University Of Karabük 
Karabük Municipality 
University Of Karabük 

 
Cities in Turkey
Populated places in Karabük Province
Districts of Karabük Province